Julianna Terbe (born 8 January 1997) is a Hungarian chess player. She qualified for the FIDE title of Woman International Master (WIM) in 2017.

Biography
She played for Hungary in the Women's Chess Olympiad:
 In 2018, at reserve board in the 43rd Chess Olympiad (women) in Batumi (+4, =3, -1).

Terbe played for Hungary in the World Women's Team Chess Championships:
 In 2019, at fourth board in the 7th Women's World Team Chess Championship in Astana (+1, =0, -5).

She played for Hungary in the European Women's Team Chess Championship:
 In 2019, at reserve board in the 22nd European Team Chess Championship (women) in Batumi (+1, =0, -2).

In 2019, Julianna Terbe ranked 3rd in one of First Saturday International Chess Tournament in Budapest. and won International Chess Tournament in Corralejo.

FIDE ratings

References

External links
 
 
 

1997 births
Living people
Hungarian female chess players
Chess Woman International Masters
Chess Olympiad competitors
People from Karcag